Tanja Morel (born October 14, 1975) is a Swiss skeleton racer who has competed since 1998. She finished seventh in the women's skeleton event at the 2006 Winter Olympics in Turin.

Zanoletti's best finish at the FIBT World Championships was fourth in the women's skeleton event on three separate occasions (2003, 2004, 2007).

References
2006 women's skeleton results
FIBT profile
Official website 
Skeletonsport.com profile

1975 births
Living people
Skeleton racers at the 2006 Winter Olympics
Swiss female skeleton racers
Olympic skeleton racers of Switzerland
20th-century Swiss women
21st-century Swiss women